Aleksei Igorevich Eskov (born 7 September 1978) is a Russian former professional football referee and a player. He has been a full international for FIFA since 2011.

Referee career
Aleksei Eskov began his referee career in 2003, he worked in the second and first divisions and the Russian Cup.

He made his debut as a referee in the Russian Premier League on 3 October 2009.

In October 2020 he retired from refereeing games.

References

External links 
 
 

1978 births
Living people
People from Nevinnomyssk
Russian footballers
Russian expatriate footballers
FC Dynamo Moscow reserves players
FC SKA Rostov-on-Don players
FC KAMAZ Naberezhnye Chelny players
FC Zhemchuzhina Sochi players
Russian football referees
Association football defenders
FC Rostov players
FC Baltika Kaliningrad players
Sportspeople from Stavropol Krai